Claes Malmberg (real name Clas-Peder Malmberg, born 8 April 1961 in Gothenburg, Sweden) is a Swedish actor and stand-up comedian. He has worked together with Anders Aldgård. He has appeared in theatre plays and in films and TV series.

Career
Malmberg was first famous as the figure Ronny Jönsson. After that he became a stand-up comedian, together with Lennie Norman. Together they were hosts of the TV program Måndagsklubben. He has appeared in Parlamentet, Så ska det låta, Doobidoo, Sing-A-Long and Pratmakarna, and on stage at Gunnebo House. In 2018, he participated in Let's Dance on TV4.

Selected filmography
2011 - Hur många lingon finns det i världen?
2010 - Saltön (TV)
2009 - Vem tror du att du är? (TV)
2009 - Guds tre flickor
2008 - Rallybrudar
2005/2006 - Hon och Hannes
1998 - När karusellerna sover (TV)
1997–99 - Pappas flicka (TV)
1997 - Kalle Blomkvist och Rasmus
1996 - Kalle Blomkvist – Mästerdetektiven lever farligt
1993 - Pariserhjulet
1992 - Kusiner i kubik (TV)
1992–93 - Lotta på Bråkmakargatan
1991 - Sunes jul (TV)
1991 - "Harry Lund" lägger näsan i blöt!

References

Swedish stand-up comedians
Swedish male actors
Living people
1961 births
People from Gothenburg
Melodifestivalen contestants of 2013